Évariste Prat (7 January 1904 – 10 October 1970) was a French cross-country skier. He competed in the men's 50 kilometre event at the 1928 Winter Olympics in Switzerland.

References

1904 births
1970 deaths
French male cross-country skiers
Olympic cross-country skiers of France
Cross-country skiers at the 1928 Winter Olympics
Sportspeople from Hautes-Alpes
20th-century French people